Máximo González and Andrés Molteni were the defending champions, but decided not to compete together. González competed alongside Roberto Maytin, while Molteni played alongside Guido Pella.

González and Maytín won the title, defeating Molteni and Pella in the final, 6–4, 7–6(7–4).

Seeds

Draw

References
 Main Draw

Campeonato Internacional de Tenis de Santos - Doubles